Tosmah (1961–1992) was a champion Thoroughbred race horse. She was the leading American filly of her generation at both two and three years of age.

Background
Tosmah was bred in Kentucky by Eugene Mori. Her sire was the great Tim Tam, by Tom Fool out of Two Lea. Many consider Tim Tam's loss of Thoroughbred racing's American Triple Crown only a matter of fate. After winning the first two legs (Kentucky Derby and Preakness Stakes), he was leading in the Belmont Stakes when he broke down, coming in second. Retired early, he went on as a sire, producing a number of stakes winners.  Tosmah is considered his very best. Her dam, Cosmah, was the 1974 Kentucky Broodmare of the Year, who also produced Halo, who sired Sunny's Halo and Sunday Silence.

Racing career
At the age of two, she started eight times and lost once.  For this, she was named the American Champion Two-Year-Old Filly of 1963. This was before the Eclipse Awards when championships were determined by the Daily Racing Form, Turf and Sports Digest magazine, and the Thoroughbred Racing Association. Tosmah was named champion by Daily Racing Form and Turf and Sports Digest, while Castle Forbes took the rival Thoroughbred Racing Association award.

When Tosmah was three, she started in fourteen races, winning ten, vying all year with a splendid filly called Old Hat. 1964 saw her highest earnings, $305,283, and the title of American Champion Three-Year-Old Filly. She was named American Champion Female Handicap Horse by Daily Racing Form.

In 1965, at the age of four she won her second Maskette Handicap (now known as the Go For Wand Handicap) under 128 pounds, in the process beating the great filly Affectionately, no. 81 in the Blood-Horse magazine List of the Top 100 U.S. Racehorses of the 20th Century, in a driving finish.

In her final season, Tosmah defeated Lucky Debonair, the winner of the 1965 Kentucky Derby, in the John B. Campbell Handicap.

Broodmare
Of four foals, Tosmah gave birth to only one stakes winner, La Guidecca.

She died in 1992 at the advanced age of thirty-one and is buried at Briardale Farm, Estell Manor, New Jersey.

Tosmah was inducted into the Hall of Fame in 1984.

Pedigree

References

 "Champions, The Lives, Times, and Past Performances of America's Greatest Thoroughbreds, Revised Edition, Champions from 1893-2004," the Daily Racing Form
 Tosmah’s pedigree and photo
 Tosmah in the Hall of Fame

1961 racehorse births
1992 racehorse deaths
Racehorses bred in Kentucky
Racehorses trained in the United States
American Champion racehorses
United States Thoroughbred Racing Hall of Fame inductees
Thoroughbred family 2-d